Martha Diamond (born 1944) is an American artist.  Her work first gained public attention in the 1980s and is included in the permanent collections of the Whitney Museum of American Art, the  Museum of Modern Art, New York, and many other institutions.

Early life and education
Diamond was born and raised in Stuyvesant Town–Peter Cooper Village, New York, where she lived across the street from another future artist, Donna Dennis. Her father, a doctor, inspired her interest in light, space and structure in the city while taking her on drives to see his patients. She graduated from Carleton College in Minnesota and returned to New York in 1965 after a year in Paris. She subsequently received an M.A. from New York University.

Work 
Although Diamond became known for her expressionistic urban landscapes, she told the poet Bill Berkson that "I’m more concerned with a vision than expressionism and I try to paint that vision realistically—I try to paint my perceptions rather than paint through emotion." 

The works in her 1988 exhibition at the Robert Miller Gallery were described in The New York Times as "deceptively simple, full of hidden skills and decisions that only gradually reveal themselves." Berkson, writing in Artforum, called her "a New York visionary" whose works are best understood in the company of such artists as John Marin, Georgia O'Keeffe, Franz Kline, Willem de Kooning, and Alex Katz. "Diamond romances the town in darting and slashing strokes," the critic Peter Schjeldahl wrote in The New Yorker, her buildings "as zestfully urbane as the perambulatory poems of Frank O’Hara." 

In addition to her painting, Diamond has taught at the Skowhegan School of Painting and Sculpture in Skowhegan, Maine; at the School of Visual Arts in New York, and at Harvard University.  She served on the Skowhegan Board of Governors from 1982 to 2018.

Collections, exhibitions and awards

Diamond's work is included in the permanent collections of the Whitney Museum of American Art, the Brooklyn Museum, the  Museum of Modern Art, New York, the National Academy of Design, the High Museum of Art in Atlanta, the North Carolina Museum of Art in Raleigh, the Museum of Fine Arts, Boston, the Farnsworth Art Museum and the Colby College Museum of Art in Maine, the Art Institute of Chicago, and the National Gallery of Australia. Her work was included in the 1989 Whitney Biennial, the catalog for which described her cityscapes as "spectral abstractions of the city, looming in a charged atmosphere enriched by her free color sense." She has also had solo exhibitions at the New York Studio School, at the Bowdoin College Museum of Art and the Portland Museum of Art in Maine, and at Eva Presenhuber, Magenta Plains, Robert Miller and other galleries in New York, in Maine and elsewhere. In 2001 she received an Arts and Letters Award from the American Academy of Arts and Letters.

References

External links
 Gallery website

1944 births
Living people
20th-century American women artists
20th-century American artists
21st-century American women